This list of informally named pterosaurs is a list of pterosaurs that have not been formally published. This can include unavailable names that have not been published under a valid name. The following types of invalid names are present:
Nomen nudum, Latin "naked name": names which have been included in print, yet not properly published according to the standards set by the International Commission on Zoological Nomenclature. The plural form, nomina nudia are not considered valid, and are not italicized as valid names are.
Nomen manuscriptum, Latin "manuscript name": A name which has appeared in a manuscript that has not been published, but intends to be. They are equivalent to nomen nudum, except for the method of publication and description.
Informal nicknames assigned by the press or researchers.

P

Pricesaurus
"Pricesaurus megalodon" ("Llewellyn Ivor Price lizard") is a nomen nudum based on remains currently assigned to Anhanguera. The remains were first brought up in a lecture by Rafael Gioia Martins-Neto in 1986. He notes several distinct features, but further research proved that all noted features are non-diagnostic and the taxon was ruled invalid due to improper naming conventions.

S

Saraikisaurus
"Saraikisaurus" ("Saraiki lizard") is a nomen manuscriptum based on a dentary (MSM-157-16) found in the Late Cretaceous (Maastrichtian)-aged Pab Formation or Vitakri Formation of Pakistan. The name was proposed by Sadiq Malkani in a conference in 2013 and was described in 2015 but the paper was not peer reviewed. The intended binomial is "S. minnhui" and it was probably a basal pterodactyloid, although Malkani created further classification (Saraikisauridae, Saraikisaurinae) but both the family and subfamily Malkani assigned to it are monotypic, containing only "Saraikisaurus" itself.

See also
List of informally named dinosaurs
Pterosauria

References

Pterosaurs
Controversial taxa